The Chicham languages, also known as Jivaroan (Hívaro, Jívaro, Jibaro) is a small language family of northern Peru and eastern Ecuador.

Family division

Chicham consists of four languages:

 1. Shuar
 2. Achuar-Shiwiar
 3. Awajun
 4. Huambisa

This language family is spoken in Amazonas, Cajamarca, Loreto, and San Martin, Peru and the Oriente region of Ecuador.

Mason (1950)
Internal classification of the Chicham languages by Mason (1950):

Jolkesky (2016)
Internal classification by Jolkesky (2016):

(† = extinct)

Jivaro
Aguaruna
Palta †
Jivaro, Nuclear
Achuar-Shiwiar
Wambisa
Shuar

Genetic relations
The extinct Palta language was classified as Chicham by Jacinto Jijón y Caamaño about 1940 and was followed by Čestmír Loukotka. However, only a few words are known, and Kaufman (1994) states that there is "little resemblance".

The most promising external connections are with the Cahuapanan languages and perhaps a few other language isolates in proposals variously called Jívaro-Cahuapana (Hívaro-Kawapánan) (Jorge Suárez and others) or Macro-Jibaro or Macro-Andean (Morris Swadesh and others, with Cahuapanan, Urarina, Puelche, and maybe Huarpe).

The unclassified language Candoshi has also been linked to Chicham, as David Payne (1981) provides reconstructions for Proto-Shuar as well as Proto-Shuar-Candoshi. However, more recently, linguists have searched elsewhere for Candoshi's relatives.

Language contact
Jolkesky (2016) notes that there are lexical similarities with the Kechua, Kwaza, Taruma, Yanomami, Katukina-Katawixi, Kandoshi, Tupi, and Arawa language families due to contact. This suggests that Chicham had originated further downstream in the Central Amazon region.

Vocabulary
Loukotka (1968) lists the following basic vocabulary items for the Chicham languages.

Proto-language
Payne's (1981) Proto-Shuar reconstruction is based on data from Shuar, Achuar, Aguaruna, and Huambisa, while his Proto-Shuar-Candoshi reconstruction also integrates data from Candoshi and Shapra.

For reconstructions of Proto-Shuar and Proto-Shuar-Candoshi by Payne (1981), see the corresponding Spanish article.

References

Bibliography

 Campbell, Lyle (1997). American Indian languages: The historical linguistics of Native America. New York: Oxford University Press. .
 Dean, Bartholomew (1990). The State and the Aguaruna: Frontier Expansion in the Upper Amazon, 1541-1990. M.A. thesis in the Anthropology of Social Change and Development, Harvard University.
 Greenberg, Joseph H. (1987). Language in the Americas. Stanford: Stanford University Press.
 Greene, Landon Shane (2004). Paths to a Visionary Politics. PhD dissertation. University of Chicago.
 Kaufman, Terrence (1990). Language history in South America: What we know and how to know more. In D. L. Payne (Ed.), Amazonian linguistics: Studies in lowland South American languages (pp. 13–67). Austin: University of Texas Press. .
 Kaufman, Terrence (1994). The native languages of South America. In C. Mosley & R. E. Asher (Eds.), Atlas of the world's languages (pp. 46–76). London: Routledge.
 Payne, David L. (1981). "Bosquejo fonológico del Proto-Shuar-Candoshi: evidencias para una relación genética." Revista del Museo Nacional 45. 323-377.
 Solís Fonseca, Gustavo (2003). Lenguas en la amazonía peruana. Lima: edición por demanda.

External links

 Proel: Familia Jibaroana
 Lengua Jíbaro
 Alain Fabre, 2005, Diccionario etnolingüístico y guía bibliográfica de los pueblos indígenas sudamericanos: JIVARO.

 
Language families
Indigenous languages of the South American Northern Foothills